Saint-Julien-Mont-Denis is a commune, in Maurienne Valley, in Savoie department in the Auvergne-Rhône-Alpes region in south-eastern France.

See also
Communes of the Savoie department

References

External links

Official site

Communes of Savoie